Qeshlaq-e Hajjilar or Qeshlaq Hajjilar may refer to:
 Qeshlaq-e Hajjilar, Ahar
 Qeshlaq-e Hajjilar, Varzaqan
 Qeshlaq-e Hajjilar, alternate name of Hajjilar, Iran, Varzaqan County